This page includes the discography of singer Despina Vandi. Vandi began a musical career in 1994 after signing with Minos EMI. She released two albums with little success, Gela Mou (1994) and Esena Perimeno (1996), before beginning an exclusive collaboration with composer Phoebus, which would eventually become one of the most successful partnerships in Greek history, and striking commercial success with her third and fourth albums Deka Endoles (1997) and Profities (1999), the latter which reached multi-platinum status. In the 2000s, Vandi and Phoebus began experimenting with more contemporary, radio-friendly pop influences in combination with laiko repertoire to much initial success. Her single "Ipofero" (2000) became the best-selling Greek single of all time (Virgin Megastores); after the success Vandi and Phoebus signed to new-found independent label Heaven Music with Gia (2001) remaining the label's biggest sales success, and one of the biggest-selling albums of all time in Greece. For the sales of Gia, Vandi became the first of four artists recording in Greece to receive a World Music Award for "World's Best Selling Greek Artist". With Gia earning success in neighboring markets as well, Vandi embarked on a career abroad briefly to some mild success; she became the first Greek artist to chart on any Billboard chart, reaching number one on the Hot Dance Airplay Chart for 2 weeks and 39 on the Hot Dance Club Play chart. The next two international singles, "Come Along Now" and "Opa Opa", achieved worldwide recognition. "Come Along Now" was heard all around the world in Coca-Cola's ads, and "Opa Opa" reached number 3 on the Hot Dance Radio Airplay of Billboard. Vandi released her first live album in 2003 before taking a maternity leave after having her first child. During this time, both her former and current label released a number of compilations and video albums to capitalize on her recent marketability. Vandi returned with another multi-platinum record, Stin Avli Tou Paradeisou, before another maternity leave. 10 Hronia Mazi (2007) was released as a celebration of her 10-year collaboration with Phoebus. In 2009 Vandi and Phoebus announced that they were leaving Heaven Music in favor of a new label founded by Phoebus. The biggest music channel in Greece, MAD TV, in tribute to the 10 years since its foundation called Despina Vandi as the biggest female Greek star in Greek music. Vandi has sold over 1 million records.

Albums

Studio albums
* denotes unknown or unavailable information.
{| class="wikitable plainrowheaders" style="text-align:center;"
|+ List of solo studio albums, with selected chart positions, sales figures and certifications
|-
! scope="col" rowspan="2" style="width:13em;" | Title
! scope="col" rowspan="2" style="width:19em;" | Details
! scope="col" colspan="3" | Peak chart positions
! scope="col" rowspan="2" style="width:12em;" | Sales
! scope="col" rowspan="2" style="width:16em;" | Certifications
|- 
! style="width:3em;font-size:85%"| GRE
! style="width:3em;font-size:85%"| CYP
! style="width:3em;font-size:85%"| TUR
|-
!scope="row" | Gela Mou
|
Released: June 3, 1994
Label: Minos EMI 
Formats: LP, Cassette, CD, digital download
| 7
| 11
| —
|
|
|-
! scope="row" | Esena Perimeno
|
Released: April 5, 1996
Label: Minos EMI
Formats: LP, Cassette, CD
| 5
| 9
| —
|
|
|-
! scope="row" | Deka Endoles
|
Released: December 10, 1997
Label: Minos EMI
Formats: Cassette, CD, digital download
| 1
| 5
| —
|
CYP: 7,000
|align="left"| 
GRE: 2× Platinum
CYP: Platinum
|-
! scope="row" | Profities
|
Released: December 8, 1999
Label: Minos EMI
Formats: Cassette, CD, digital download
| 1
| 1
| *
|
CYP: 15,000
|align="left"| 
GRE: 3× Platinum
CYP: 3× Platinum
|-
! scope="row" | Gia
|
Released: December 17, 2001
Label: Heaven Music 
Formats: Cassette, CD
| 1
| 1
| 1
|
TUR: 100,000
|align="left"| 
GRE: 5× Platinum
CYP: 3× Platinum
TUR: Gold
|-
! scope="row" | Stin Avli Tou Paradeisou
|
Released: December 20, 2004
Label: Heaven Music
Formats: CD
| 1
| 6
| *
|
GRE: 110,000
|align="left"| 
GRE: 2× Platinum
CYP: Platinum
|-
! scope="row" |  10 Hronia Mazi
|
Released: December 5, 2007
Label: Heaven Music
Formats: CD, digital download
| 3
| 4
| *
|
|align="left"| 
GRE: Platinum
CYP: Platinum
|-
! scope="row" | C'est La Vie
|
Released: June 13, 2010
Label: Spicy Music 
Formats: CD, LP, digital download
| *
| *
| *
|
|align="left"| 
GRE: 11× Platinum
CYP: 2× Platinum
|-
! scope="row" | Allaxa
|
Released: April 27, 2012
Label: Spicy Music
Formats: CD, digital download
| 1
| *
| *
|
|
GRE: 2× Platinum
CYP: Platinum
|-
! scope="row" | De Me Stamatises
|
Released: December 22, 2014
Label: Heaven Music
Formats: CD, digital download
| 2
| *
| *
|
|
GRE: Platinum
|-
! scope="row" | Afti Einai I Diafora Mas
|
Released: October 6, 2016
Label: Heaven Music
Formats: CD, digital download
| 1
| *
| *
|
|
GRE: Gold
|-
! scope="row" | To Diko Mou Cinema
|
 Released: July 17, 2019
 Label: Panik Records
 Formats: CD, digital download
| 5
| * 
| * 
|
|
|}

Live albums

Reissues

Soundtrack albums

Collaborative albums

Extended plays

Compilation albums

International compilation albums

Greek compilation albums

Promotional compilation albums

Singles

As lead artist
The following are either CD singles, maxi singles, or EPs, all of which chart on the Singles Chart in Greece. In Greece and Cyprus singles are usually only released as radio singles rather than physical releases.

Notes

As featured artist

Full singles discography
Listed below are promo singles released by radio and music video by Despina Vandi. They were not released as stand-alone CDs, as is common in Greece and Cyprus.

Album appearances

Guest contributions

As vocalist

Videography

Video albums

Karaoke albums

Music videos

Appearances

Albums

Singles & EPs

Compilations

Mixes

Videos

Footnotes

A. ^ C'est La Vie was released as a covermount with the nationwide newspaper Real News that sold 103,200 copies that day. However IFPI Greece does not award certifications for albums released with newspapers unless each copy of the album has been paid for, thus this indicates that the album has not sold enough official retail copies to receive a certification.

References

External links
Official site 
Discogs

Discographies of Greek artists
Discography
Pop music discographies